Erlaa may refer to:
Erlaa (Vienna), a cadastral commune of Vienna
a cadastral commune of Asperhofen
the Latvian municipality Ērgļi